Miles is an unincorporated community in Lincoln County, in the U.S. state of Washington. It is located adjacent to Fort Spokane where the Spokane River empties into the Columbia River.

History
A post office called Miles was in operation from 1881 until 1962. The community was named after Gen. Nelson A. Miles.  The post office was the address of Fort Spokane.

References

Unincorporated communities in Lincoln County, Washington
Unincorporated communities in Washington (state)